Mahatma Gandhi College, established in 1981, is a general degree college in Daldali, Lalpur, Purulia district in Indian state of West Bengal. It offers undergraduate courses in arts, commerce and sciences.

Accreditation and affiliation
The college is recognized by the University Grants Commission (UGC). Recently, it was awarded B grade by the National Assessment and Accreditation Council (NAAC). It is affiliated to Sidho Kanho Birsha University.

Departments
The college has the following departments in Science, Arts and Commerce.

Science

Chemistry
The college has  its chemistry department with an intake of 30 students. It got affiliation for this department on the session 2005–06. And the course introduced from 2010–2011 session.

Mathematics
The mathematics department of this college is introduced on 2010–11 session and it has capacity of 30 students.

Computer Science
The college has got affiliation for this department on 2010–11 session. Currently, it has an intake of 20 students.

Botany
Botany department of this college got affiliation on 2005–06 session and this course has been started from 2010–2011 session with an intake of 30 students.

Zoology
The college has its chemistry department with an intake of 30 students. It got affiliation for this department on the session 2005–06. And the course introduced from 2010–2011 session.

Arts and Commerce

Bengali
English
Sanskrit
Santhali
History
Geography
Political Science
Philosophy
Economics
Education
Commerce

See also

References

External links
Mahatma Gandhi College
Sidho Kanho Birsha University
University Grants Commission
National Assessment and Accreditation Council

Colleges affiliated to Sidho Kanho Birsha University
Educational institutions established in 1981
Academic institutions formerly affiliated with the University of Burdwan
Universities and colleges in Purulia district
1981 establishments in West Bengal